Breakaway is the fifth studio album by Scottish duo Gallagher and Lyle.  The title track became a hit for Art Garfunkel, and "I Wanna Stay with You" was a U.S. Pop (#49) hit, U.S. AC (#27) hit and it reached number 6 in United Kingdom. A second hit from the album, "Heart on My Sleeve," also charted in both Canada and the U.S., reaching the Top 20 on the U.S. Easy Listening chart, number six in the United Kingdom and number 2 in the Irish charts.

Track listing 
All tracks composed by Benny Gallagher and Graham Lyle
 "Breakaway" – 4:05
 "Stay Young" – 3:41
 "I Wanna Stay with You" – 3:00
 "Heart on My Sleeve" – 3:23
 "Fifteen Summers" – 4:08
 "Sign of the Times" – 3:41
 "If I Needed Someone" – 4:33
 "Storm in My Soul" – 2:24
 "Rockwriter" – 3:09
 "Northern Girl" – 2:52

Charts

Weekly charts

Year-end charts

Personnel 
Andy Fairweather Low - additional vocals on "Heart on My Sleeve", "If I Needed Someone" and "Storm in My Soul"
Ray Duffy – drums
Geoff Emerick – engineer
Benny Gallagher – vocals, keyboards, guitar, accordion
Alan Hornall – bass
Jimmy Jewell – saxophone
Billy Livsey – keyboards
Graham Lyle – vocals, guitar, mandolin
John Mumford – trombone, euphonium, timbales
Brian Rogers - string arrangements
Gered Mankowitz - photography

References

Gallagher and Lyle albums
1976 albums
A&M Records albums
Albums produced by David Kershenbaum